Kevin Nicolás 'Nico' Ratti Fredes (born 18 September 1993) is an Argentine footballer who plays for FC Andorra as a goalkeeper. He also holds Italian citizenship.

Club career
Born in Mendoza, Argentina, Ratti started his career at lowly locals Huracán de San Rafael before moving to Spain in 2005. He immediately joined FC Andorra's youth setup, making his first team debuts in 2010 at the age of just 16.

In the 2011 summer, after having trials at Real Madrid, Ratti joined CD Numancia, returning to youth football. On 12 July of the following year he signed for Segunda División B side UE Llagostera, initially as a backup to José Moragón.

Ratti made his senior debut on 12 May 2013, starting in a 0–1 home loss against RCD Mallorca B. He appeared in his first professional match on 15 October 2015, starting in a 2–1 away win against Real Zaragoza, for the season's Copa del Rey.

On 18 October 2015, Ratti made his Segunda División debut, playing the full 90 minutes in a 3–1 home win against Real Valladolid.

After a spell with UE Sant Julià, Ratti returned to FC Andorra in January 2019.

References

External links
Llagostera official profile 

1993 births
Living people
Sportspeople from Mendoza, Argentina
Argentine footballers
Argentine people of Italian descent
Citizens of Italy through descent
Association football goalkeepers
Primera Federación players
Segunda División players
Segunda División B players
UE Costa Brava players
FC Andorra players
Primera Divisió players
UE Sant Julià players
Argentine expatriate footballers
Expatriate footballers in Andorra
Expatriate footballers in Spain
Argentine expatriate sportspeople in Andorra
Argentine expatriate sportspeople in Spain